The F110 class, also known as the Bonifaz class, are a multi-purpose, anti-submarine class of Aegis combat system-fitted heavy frigates under construction for the Spanish Navy. The project is being co-developed by the Spanish Ministry of Defence and the state-owned company Navantia. The construction of the first unit ( es:Bonifaz (F-111)) started in April 2022 and are scheduled to be delivered starting in about 2025.

Project history

The origins of the F110 class project are in the planned replacement for the Spanish Navy's s, as contemplated in the ALTAMAR Plan (Spanish naval white book to modernize the Spanish Navy), with five frigates originally to be built as an enlarged version of the s. This concept was later discarded in favor of a mostly clean sheet design.

On 23 December 2011, the Spanish Ministry of Defence awarded a €2 million contract to Indra and Navantia for the design of an integrated sensor mast, and in 2015, both companies agreed to develop and integrate the mast and future sensor suite in the ship's SCOMBA (Local Aegis version) combat system. Both companies created a consortium called Protec 110 for this project, with finance from the Ministry of Industry, Energy and Tourism (now Ministry of Energy, Tourism and Digital Agenda and Ministry of Economy, Industry and Competitiveness).

On 27 June 2017, the Spanish fleet admiral said that his Navy hopes the project will be approved by the end of 2017 or by 2018 at the latest. In September 2018, the Spanish Ministry of Defence announced the selection of the Raytheon RIM-162 ESSM Block 2 as the ships' primary anti-air self-defence weapon.

The go-ahead order for the project was approved by the Spanish Council of Ministers on 29 March 2019.

On 6 April 2022, an official act was carried out that began the construction of the first of the units.

Navy specifications
According to statements by Frigate Captain Carlos Martínez-Merello, Head of the Resources and Media Definition Section of the General Staff of the Navy in 2010, during the Conference on Naval Programs in progress and future programs, that the new frigate must be adapted to the current scenarios in response to conventional and asymmetric threats, such as patrol of a coastline or operations against pirates, which do not require a large vessel.

According to the Spanish Navy, the new frigates must have an operational life of 40 years, have accommodation for extra personnel, and be capable of operating with unmanned vehicles—aerial, surface, and sub-surface. Regarding the desired characteristics, the Navy requests a sustained speed in excess of 25 knots. The F110 will have a multi-purpose area for flexible mission profiles, 240 days of operation at sea, and 18 months of high availability.

Navantia project

Navantia is working on the project referred to by the company as F2M2 and is already in operation a working group that together with members of the Spanish Navy will structure the ship's capabilities.

The first design of the five presented was of trimaran type, but this was rejected due to the noise of its propulsion system, a great disadvantage since it is looking to develop an anti-submarine ship. The vessel will be  shorter than the F100 and will have a narrower beam of  against  of the F100. It can perform humanitarian and combat operations. The superstructure of the vessel will be integrated. What is certain is that the SCOMBA system will be installed.

To make it more difficult to locate by radar or thermal imaging, the class will have some stealth capacity that masts or blocks of sensors will not be installed on the superstructure. It will have a single gas escape zone that will be installed in the upper deck, and the air intakes will be placed in line with the superstructure. The loading area shall be designed below the flight area with the installation of a downhill ramp on the starboard side.

The ship's hull will be made of steel. The material of the superstructure is not yet defined, although it is likely to be a composite material instead of aluminum.

Units
There are five units of the class planned. Italics indicate estimated dates.

See also
 Type 26 frigate, an equivalent British design
  stealth frigates of the Indian Navy
 , a Dutch class of comparable frigates
 , a German class of frigates
 FREMM multipurpose frigate, French/Italian collaboration
 , Italian class of comparable frigates
 , Australian class of frigates
 , of the Danish Navy has roughly the same tonnage
 List of frigates

References

Frigate classes
Frigates of the Spanish Navy
Proposed ships